Justus is an unincorporated community in Stark County, in the U.S. state of Ohio.

History
Justus had its start in 1872 when the Wheeling and Lake Erie Railroad was extended to that point. The community was named after the local Justus family.  A post office called Justus was established in 1874, and remained in operation until 1964.

Notable person
Benjamin Franklin Fairless, a steel executive, was raised in Justus.

References

Unincorporated communities in Stark County, Ohio
Unincorporated communities in Ohio